Vittorio Micolucci (born 14 August 1983) is an Italian former professional footballer who last played as a defender.

He made his Serie A debut on 14 January 2001 against S.S. Lazio.

External links
http://www.gazzetta.it/speciali/serie_b/2008_nw/giocatori/54586.shtml

1983 births
Living people
People from Giulianova
Association football defenders
Italian footballers
Udinese Calcio players
Delfino Pescara 1936 players
S.S.C. Bari players
Ascoli Calcio 1898 F.C. players
Serie B players
Sportspeople from the Province of Teramo
Footballers from Abruzzo